Peter Onorati (born May 16, 1953) is an American actor. He is known for his TV roles as Charlie Howell on Civil Wars (1991–1993), Mr. Scotto on Murder One (1995–1997), Stanley Pearson on This Is Us (2017–2022), and Jeff Mumford on S.W.A.T. (2017–2019), and his movie roles in Goodfellas (1990), and Fallen Arches (1998).

Early life and education
He was born and raised in Boonton, New Jersey and attended Boonton High School. He attended Lycoming College and Fairleigh Dickinson University.

Filmography

Film

Television

Videogames

References

External links
 

1953 births
20th-century American male actors
21st-century American male actors
American male film actors
American male television actors
American male voice actors
American people of Italian descent
Boonton High School alumni
Male actors from New Jersey
Fairleigh Dickinson University alumni
Living people
People from Boonton, New Jersey